The chapters of The Prince of Tennis manga series are written and illustrated by Takeshi Konomi, and were serialized in Japan's manga magazine Weekly Shōnen Jump from July 1999 to March 2008. A sequel to the series entitled The Prince of Tennis II began serialization in Japan in the monthly magazine Jump Square on March 4, 2009. The story centers around a cocky tennis prodigy named Ryoma Echizen, who, upon his father's urging, enrolls in a private middle school called Seishun Academy ("Seigaku" for short), which, besides being famous for its strong tennis team, is his father's alma mater. The storyline of the first manga series revolves around Seigaku striving to become the National middle school tennis champions, while the sequel takes place several months after their National victory.

The Prince of Tennis manga spans a total of 379 chapters (380 if chapter "0" is included), which have been collected into 42 tankōbon volumes. Shueisha distributed these volumes in Japan, with the first volume being released on January 7, 2000, and the last on June 4, 2008. Each of the chapters are referred to as a "Genius", with the exception of chapters 245 to 247 which are primarily referred to as the "Wild" chapters since they are told from a different character's point of view. The sequel's chapters are each referred to as a "Golden Age". Three official fan books were also released by Shueisha, as well as one illustration book. Kenichi Sakura created a short tribute manga entitled The Prince of Afterschool, which began serialization in Jump Square in November 2008.

The series has been adapted into several forms of other media including a 178 episode anime series directed by Takayuki Hamana that aired from October 2001 to March 2005, and a series of subsequent OVAs released onto several DVDs. The anime, combined with the OVAs, roughly covers the storyline of the first manga series. It also spawned an ongoing series of musicals, as well as two featured films: one original animated film and the other being a live-action which loosely follows the events of the first eighteen volumes.

Viz Media licensed the series and distributes an English version of the manga in North America under the Shonen Jump imprint. The first English language volume was released on May 19, 2004, and the last one was released on July 5, 2011. The English anime adaptation debuted in North America as streaming media on Toonami Jetstream on July 14, 2006.

Volume list

The Prince of Tennis

Volumes 1 – 21

Volumes 22 – 42

The Prince of Tennis II

Chapters not yet in Tankōbon format

The Prince of After School

Other

Official fan books

The Prince of Tennis

The Prince of Tennis II

Illustrations book

See also 
List of The Prince of Tennis episodes
The Prince of Tennis (live-action film)
Tennis no Ōjisama - Futari no Samurai (animated film)

References

External links 
 Official Prince of Tennis website 
 Shonen Jump's The Prince of Tennis website
 Viz Media's manga profile for The Prince of Tennis

The Prince of Tennis
Lists of manga volumes and chapters